Australia competed at the 1928 Summer Olympics in Amsterdam, Netherlands. 18 competitors, 14 men and 4 women, took part in 26 events in 6 sports.

Due to economic difficulties, Australia could only afford to send ten athletes to the Games, as the estimated cost of funding was A$720 per athlete. However, other athletes were allowed to compete on the condition that they secure private or community funding. Eight athletes were funded in this way, including Dunc Gray.

Medalists

Athletics

Key
Note–Ranks given for track events are within the athlete's heat only
Q = Qualified for the next round
q = Qualified for the next round as a fastest loser or, in field events, by position without achieving the qualifying target
NR = National record
N/A = Round not applicable for the event
Bye = Athlete not required to compete in round
NP = Not placed

Men
Track & road events

Men
Field Events

Women
Track & road events

Cycling

Two cyclists, both men, competed for Australia in 1928.

Track cycling
Ranks given are within the heat.

Diving

Ranks given are within the heat.

Rowing

Ranks given are within the heat.

Swimming

Men
Ranks given are within the heat.

Women
Ranks given are within the heat.

Wrestling

Freestyle wrestling
 Men's

References

External links
Andrews, Malcolm, Australia at the Olympics, ABC Books, 2000
Official Olympic Reports
International Olympic Committee results database
sports-reference

Nations at the 1928 Summer Olympics
1928
Olympics